Turkish Film Critics Association ( or SİYAD) is a non-governmental organization based in Istanbul, founded in 1977 by film critic Atilla Dorsay. It distributes the annual Turkish Film Critics Association Awards and also a member of the International Federation of Film Critics.

History
The Turkish Film Critics Association was founded in 1977 by film critic Atilla Dorsay. It was closed in 1980 after the 1980 Turkish coup d'état. SİYAD was re-established in 1993 by Saim Yavuz, Turgut Yasalar, Atilla Dorsay, Agah Özgüç, Vecdi Sayar, Kamil Suveren and Necati Sönmez. The association was headed by Atilla Dorsay until 2005, when Mehmet Açar was elected as the president. SİYAD later headed by the following film critics: Mehmet Açar (2005–07), Murat Özer (2007–10), Tunca Arslan (2010–13), Alin Taşçıyan (2013–14), Melis Behlil (2014–15) and Tulle Akbal-Süalp (2015).

Award
The award ceremonies take place in Istanbul, Turkey to honor the best Turkish films. The categories include:
 Best Film
 Best Director
 Mahmut Tali Award for Best Script
 Cahide Sonku Award for Best Actress
 Best Actor
 Best Supporting Actress
 Best Supporting Actor
 Best Cinematographer
 Best Music
 Best Editor
 Best Art Director
 Honorary Awards

See also
 43rd SİYAD Awards
 44th SİYAD Awards

References

External links
  for SİYAD (Turkish)

Turkish film awards
Organizations established in 1977
Film organizations in Turkey
Film critics associations
Non-profit organizations based in Turkey